Avigdor Lieberman
 Orly Levi-Abekasis
 Sofa Landver
 Ilan Shohat
 Sharon Gal
 Hamad Amar
 Robert Ilatov
 Oded Forer
 Yulia Melanovsky
 Alex Miller
 Shimon Ohayon
 Leon Litinetski
 Arkady Pomerantz
 Shimon Ohayon
 Shady Halol
 Moshe Mytz Matalon
 Alexander Kushnir
 Marina Koritni
 Amir Schneider
 Ashley Perry
 Adam Amilov
 David Ben-Abraham
 Michael Kalvav
 Gaston Ariel Sidman
 Yanon Katz
 Kelly Belcker
 Yahya Hayav
 Anton Misharokov
 Alon Shahar
 Yuri Goldstein

External links
Central Elections Committee Official Yisrael Beitenu List

Lists of Israeli politicians